Ravi Iyengar, is a principal investigator at The Mount Sinai Medical Center.

Trained as a biochemist, Iyengar studies cellular signaling networks using both experiments and computer simulations. His laboratory focuses on how cell signals are routed and processed through cellular signaling networks within cells to discover new drug targets for complex diseases. He has published more than 100 primary papers, 92 reviews and is the editor of 6 books.

Biography
Iyengar earned both an undergraduate degree in Chemistry and Physics in 1971 and a master's degree in Biophysics in 1973 from the University of Mumbai in India. He completed his Ph.D. in Biophysical Sciences at the University of Houston in 1977. He joined Baylor College of Medicine in 1977 as a postdoctoral fellow and rose to assistant and then associate professor. In 1986, he joined the Department of Pharmacology at The Mount Sinai Medical Center as an associate professor. In 1999, he was appointed chairman of the Department of Pharmacology at Mount Sinai, and in 2001 he was named Mount Sinai's Dorothy H. and Lewis Rosenstiel Professor and chair of the Department of Pharmacology and Biological Chemistry. He stepped down from his position as chair in January 2014.

Iyengar served as the dean of research for The Mount Sinai School of Medicine from 2002 to 2004.

In 2004, Iyengar was elected fellow of the American Association for the Advancement of Science. Additional honors include:
Established Investigator, American Heart Association, 1980–1983
New Investigator Award, NIH, 1978–1980
National Research Service Award, NIH

Iyengar holds Patent No. 20080261820: Methods to Analyze Biological Networks.

Research grants
Structure and Function of Signal Transducing Components, 5R01DK03876-21, National Institute of Diabetes and Digestive and Kidney Diseases
Dynamics Underlying Tissue Integrity, 1R01DK087650-01, National Institute of Diabetes and Digestive Diseases and Kidney Diseases
Systems Biology Center in New York,  5P50GM071558-03, National Institute of General Medical Sciences
Functions of Regulatory Motifs in Signaling Networks, 5R01GM054508-21, National Institute of General Medical Sciences
Modeling Cell Regulatory Networks, 5R01GM072853-04, National Institute of General Medical Sciences

Books
Heterotrimeric G Proteins, Volume 237 (Methods in Enzymology). John N. Abelson, Melvin I. Simon, Ravi Iyengar, editors. Academic Press; 1st edition (June 28, 1994) 
Heterotrimeric G-Protein Effectors, Volume 238 (Methods in Enzymology). John N. Abelson, Melvin I. Simon, Ravi Iyengar, Editors. Academic Press; 1st Edition (September 1994) 
G Protein Pathways, Part A: Receptors, Volume 343 (Methods in Enzymology). Ravi Iyengar, John D. Hildebrandt, Editors. Academic Press; 1st Edition (October 2001) 
G Protein Pathways, Part B: G Proteins and Their Regulators, Volume 344 (Methods in Enzymology). Ravi Iyengar, John D. Hildebrandt, Editors. Academic Press; 1st Edition (December 2001) 
G Protein Pathways, Part C: Effector Mechanisms, Volume 345 (Methods in Enzymology). Ravi Ravi Iyengar, John D. Hildebrandt, Editors. Academic Press; 1st Edition (October 2001)

Publications
Partial list:

References

External links
Laboratories and Programs/Iyengar Laboratory at The Mount Sinai Medical Center

Indian biochemists
Living people
Icahn School of Medicine at Mount Sinai faculty
Systems biologists
University of Mumbai alumni
University of Houston alumni
Baylor College of Medicine faculty
Fellows of the American Association for the Advancement of Science
Year of birth missing (living people)